Ma Wanfu (1849–1934), also known as Hajji Guoyuan, was a Dongxiang Imam of Guoyuan village in Hezhou (present day Dongxiang Autonomous County in Linxia Hui Autonomous Prefecture, Gansu Province). He studied in Mecca and founded the Ikhwan (Yihewani 伊赫瓦尼) movement in 1888, also known as the "New Sect" (Chinese Xinjiao pai, 新教派 or Xinxinjiao, 新新教), spreading in Gansu, Ningxia and Qinghai. He (along with the Yihewani movement) opposed Sufism.

Life
Ma Wanfu supported the Dungan revolt (1895–1896) against the Qing Dynasty, along with Ma Dahan and Ma Yonglin, but the rebellion was crushed by Chinese Muslim Hui forces led by Dong Fuxiang, Ma Anliang, Ma Fuxiang, Ma Fulu and Ma Guoliang. Ma Wanfu surrendered, betraying the fellow Dongxiang rebel leader Ma Dahan.

In 1915, Ma Anliang and Yang Zengxin arrested and attempted to execute Ma Wanfu, when Ma Qi rescued him as he was being shipped to execution and brought him to Xining.

Literature
 Hu Fan: Islam in Shaanxi: Past and Present. Diss. Bonn 2008
 Ma Kexun 马克勋: "Zhongguo Yisilanjiao Yihewanyi pai di changdaozhe – Ma Wanfu (Guoyuan)" 中国伊斯兰教伊赫瓦尼派的倡导者——马万福(果园) [The Founder of China's Islamic Ikhwan movement: Ma Wanfu]. In: Yisilanjiao zai Zhongguo [Islam in China], ed. Gansu Provincial Ethnology Department. Yinchuan: Ningxia Renmin chubanshe 1982 (Chinese)
Ma Zhanbiao: "Yihewani jiaopei yu Ma Wanfu" (Yihewani und Ma Wanfu), In: Xibei Huizu yu Yiselanjiao. Yinchuan: Ningxia Renmin chubanshe 1994
 Mikko Suutarinen: The Dongxiang People of Gansu – Ethnic, Religious and Local Identities (Religious Identity) (PDF format; 320 kB)

See also
 Muhammad ibn Abd al-Wahhab

References

External links
 Ma Wanfu – Chinese
 Birth and Growth of Sects and Menhuans – English
 Yihewani sect – English
 Huizu lishi dashiji – Chinese
 Ikhwani – English
 Zhongguo Yisilanjiao Yihewanyi pai de changdaozhe Ma Wanfu – Chinese

1849 births
1934 deaths
Religious leaders in China
Dongxiang people
People from Linxia
Chinese imams